Ahmad Hamza al-Mahdi is a Libyan politician who has been a member of the Presidential Council of Libya since 2016, which is the executive body of the Government of National Accord.

References

20th-century births
Living people
Government ministers of Libya
Members of the Presidential Council (Libya)
Year of birth missing (living people)